IEC 61131-3 is the third part (of 10) of the open international standard IEC 61131 for programmable logic controllers. It was first published in December 1993 by the IEC; the current (third) edition was published in February 2013.

Part 3 of IEC 61131 deals with basic software architecture and programming languages of the control program within PLC. It defines three graphical and two textual programming language standards:
 Ladder diagram (LD), graphical
 Function block diagram (FBD), graphical
 Structured text (ST), textual
 Instruction list (IL), textual (deprecated in 3rd edition of the standard)
 Sequential function chart (SFC), has elements to organize programs for sequential and parallel control processing, graphical.

Data types 
 Elementary Data Type
 Bit Strings – groups of on/off values
 BOOL - 1 bit (0,1)
 BYTE  –  8 bit (1 byte)
 WORD  – 16 bit (2 byte)
 DWORD – 32 bit (4 byte)
 LWORD – 64 bit (8 byte)
 INTEGER – whole numbers (Considering byte size 8 bits)
 SINT  – signed short integer (1 byte)
 INT – signed integer (2 byte)
 DINT – signed double integer (4 byte)
 LINT – signed long integer (8 byte)
 USINT  – Unsigned short integer (1 byte)
 UINT – Unsigned integer (2 byte)
 UDINT – Unsigned double integer (4 byte)
 ULINT – Unsigned long integer (8 byte)
 REAL – floating point IEC 60559 (same as IEEE 754-2008)
 REAL  – (4 byte)
 LREAL – (8 byte)

Duration 
 TIME  – (4 byte). Literals in the form of T#5m90s15ms
 LTIME – (8 byte). Literals extend to nanoseconds in the form of T#5m90s15ms542us15ns
 Date
 DATE – calendar date (Size is not specified)
 LDATE – calendar date (Size is not specified)
 Time of day
 TIME_OF_DAY / TOD – clock time(Size is not specified)
 LTIME_OF_DAY / LTOD – clock time (8 byte)
 Date and time of Day
 DATE_AND_TIME / DT  – time and date(Size is not specified)
 LDATE_AND_TIME / LDT  – time and date(8 byte)
 Character / Character string
 CHAR – Single-byte character (1 byte)
 WCHAR – Double-byte character (2 byte)
 STRING – Variable-length single-byte character string. Literals specified with single quote, 'This is a STRING Literal'
 WSTRING – Variable-length double-byte character string. Literals specified with a double quote, "This is a WSTRING Literal"

Generic Data Types – Only available for the input / output/ in-out variables of system-defined Program Organization Units (POUs, see below)
 ANY
 ANY_DERIVED
 ANY_ELEMENTARY
 ANY_MAGNITUDE
 ANY_NUM
 ANY_REAL: LREAL, REAL
 ANY_INT
 ANY_UNSIGNED: ULINT, UDINT, UINT, USINT
 ANY_SIGNED: LINT, DINT, INT, SINT
 ANY_DURATION: TIME, LTIME
 ANY_BIT: LWORD, DWORD, WORD, BYTE, BOOL
 ANY_CHARS
 ANY_STRING: STRING, WSTRING
 ANY_CHAR: CHAR, WCHAR
 ANY_DATE: DATE_AND_TIME (DT), DATE_AND_TIME(LDT), DATE, TIME_OF_DAY (TOD), LTIME_OF_DAY(LTOD)
 User-defined Data Types
 Enumerated data type
 Enumerated data type with named value
 Subrange data type – puts limits on value i.e., INT(4 .. 20) for current
 Array data type – multiple values stored in the same variable.
 Structured data type – composite of several variables and types.
 Directly derived data type – type derived from one of the above types to give new name and initial value as a type.
 References – a kind of strongly typed pointer. Arithmetic operation of the value of this type is prohibited.

Variables 
Variable attributes: RETAIN, CONSTANT, AT
 Global
 Direct (local)
 I/O Mapping – Input, Output, I/O
 External
 Temporary

Configuration 
 Resource – Like a CPU
 Tasks – Can be multiple per CPU.
 Programs – Can be executed once, on a timer, on an event.

Program organization unit (POU) 
 Functions
 Standard: ADD, SQRT, SIN, COS, GT, MIN, MAX, AND, OR, etc.
 Custom
 Function Blocks
 Standard:
 Custom – Libraries of functions can be supplied by a vendor or third party.
 Programs

Configuration, resources, tasks 
 Configuration – processing resources, memory for IO, execution rates, number of tasks.

Object oriented programming (OOP) 

 The 3rd revision of the standard describes how to implement OOP within the application programming

References

External links 
 PLCopen
 IEC 61131-3:2013 Programmable controllers - Part 3: Programming languages
CODESYS important implementation independent of device manufacturers, includes object oriented programming (OOP) as an option
 :de:STEP 7 implementation for Siemens devices, only

 
Electronic design automation
IEC 61131